Syahredzan bin Johan (born 10 June 1983) is a Malaysian politician and lawyer who has served as the Member of Parliament (MP) for Bangi since November 2022. He is a member of the Democratic Action Party (DAP), a component party of the Pakatan Harapan (PH) coalition.

Early life 
Syahredzan Johan was born in Petaling Jaya, Selangor on 10 June 1983, to Tan Sri Johan Jaaffar, former chairman of Dewan Bahasa dan Pustaka (DBP). Syahredzan graduated with a LL.B. degree from Cardiff University in 2005 before he was called to the Bar of England and Wales. He subsequently returned to Malaysia and read in the chambers of RamRais & Partners, and was admitted as an advocate and solicitor of the High Court of Malaya in October 2007

Political career 
He began his political career in 2018 after being appointed as political secretary to Lim Kit Siang. He was elected to Parliament in the 2022 general election for the Bangi seat after his predecessor Ong Kian Ming decided not to seek reelection as the Bangi MP.

Election results

References

See also 
 Members of the Dewan Rakyat, 15th Malaysian Parliament

Living people
1983 births
Democratic Action Party (Malaysia) politicians
21st-century Malaysian politicians
Members of the Dewan Rakyat